Santa Severina is a town and comune in the province of Crotone, in the Calabria region of southern Italy.

Name
The name derives from ancient Siberine (῾Αγία Σεβερίνη, Σεβεριάνη). There is no saint named Severina in the Greek or Roman calendar of saints.

History 
It is the birthplace of Pope Zachary and also of Henry Aristippus, who was a religious scholar and writer at the court of the Norman Kingdom of Sicily.

Ecclesiastical History 

The bishopric -established around 400 AD- and -since around 100 AD- Metropolitan Archdiocese of Santa Severina (v.) was suppressed on 30 September 1986, its title and territory being merged into the Metropolitan Roman Catholic Archdiocese of Crotone–Santa Severina.

Geography 
The town is bordered by Belvedere di Spinello, Caccuri, Castelsilano, Rocca di Neto, Roccabernarda, San Mauro Marchesato and Scandale.

Culture 
There is a cultural festival which is held each year in August in Santa Severina, focusing on traditional Italian music.

Twin towns 
  Mangalia, Romania

External links 
 Summer festival in Santa Severina
 Official Homepage of Santa Severina

Notes and references 

Cities and towns in Calabria